Thomas William Luddy (June 4, 1943 – February 13, 2023) was an American film producer and the co-founder of the Telluride Film Festival. He has a longtime association with the production company American Zoetrope. He has been a member of the jury at the 11th Moscow International Film Festival, the 38th Berlin International Film Festival and the 1993 Cannes Film Festival.

Background and work
Luddy was born in New York City and raised in the suburb of White Plains, New York. He moved to California to attend the University of California, Berkeley, where he studied English and became involved in political activism and the local film community.

In the 1970s, Luddy organized screenings for the Pacific Film Archive at Berkeley, with a particular focus in bringing foreign films to the United States. He also produced films, frequently for American Zoetrope. He partially funded Mishima: A Life in Four Chapters on his personal credit card.

In 1974, Luddy and a group of friends founded the Telluride Film Festival, envisioning it to be an event without the extensive media presence of other festivals, and screening a variety of new and old titles.

Personal life and death
Luddy was married to the former Monique Montgomery. He died from complications of Parkinson's disease at his home in Berkeley on February 13, 2023, at the age of 79.

Filmography
 Werner Herzog Eats His Shoe (1980) - associate producer
 Mishima: A Life in Four Chapters (1985) - producer
 Barfly - producer
 King Lear (1987) - associate producer (uncredited)
 Tough Guys Don't Dance (1987) - executive producer
 Manifesto (1988) - executive producer
 Powaqqatsi (1988) - associate producer
 Wait Until Spring, Bandini (1989) - producer
 Wind (1992) - producer
 The Secret Garden (1993) - producer
 My Family (1995) - executive producer
 Sworn to the Drum: A Tribute to Francisco Aguabella (1995) - producer
 Lani Loa – The Passage (1998) - executive producer
 Cachao: Uno Mas (2008) - producer

References

External links

1943 births
2023 deaths
Deaths from Parkinson's disease
Film directors from New York (state)
Film producers from New York (state)
Neurological disease deaths in California
People from Berkeley, California
Telluride Film Festival
University of California, Berkeley alumni